Pier Giovanni "Gianni" Poli (born 5 November 1957 in Lumezzane) is a former Italian long-distance runner who won the New York City Marathon in 1986.

He also won the silver in medal in the marathon at the 1990 European Athletics Championships.

Biography
Gianni Poli participated at one edition of the Summer Olympics (1988), he has 12 caps in national team from 1979 to 1990.

Achievements

National titles
Gianni Poli has won one time the individual national championship.
1 win in marathon (1984)

See also
 Italian all-time lists - Marathon

References

External links
 

1957 births
Living people
Italian male long-distance runners
Italian male marathon runners
Athletes (track and field) at the 1988 Summer Olympics
Olympic athletes of Italy
European Athletics Championships medalists
New York City Marathon male winners
World Athletics Championships athletes for Italy